NSS-703 (also known as Intelsat 703, IS-703 and Intelsat 7-F3) is a geostationary communication satellite that was built by Space Systems/Loral (SSL). It is located in the orbital position of 29.5 degrees east longitude and it is currently in an inclined orbit. The same is owned by Intelsat and after sold to SES World Skies on November 30, 1998. The satellite was based on the LS-1300 platform and its estimated useful life was 15 years.

The satellite was successfully launched into space on October 6, 1994, at 06:35:02, using an Atlas II vehicle from the Cape Canaveral Air Force Station, United States. It had a launch mass of 3,695 kg.

The NSS-703 is equipped with 26 transponders in C band and 10 in Ku band to provide broadcasting, business-to-home services, telecommunications, VSATnetworks.

External links 
 Intelsat 703 TBS satellite
 Intelsat 7 Gunter's Space Page
 Intelsat 703 SatBeams

References 

Spacecraft launched in 1975
Intelsat satellites
SES satellites